Brigitte Fitzgerald is a fictional character and the main protagonist in the Ginger Snaps film trilogy. She was portrayed by Emily Perkins.

Development

Production and design 
Brigitte Fitzgerald was the concept of Canadian screenwriter Karen Walton and film director John Fawcett. The first film in the Ginger Snaps trilogy examines Brigitte's relationship with her sister Ginger and how Brigitte's connection with a local "pretty-boy pusher" to find a cure for Ginger's lycanthropy transformation threatens to undermine the unbreakable bond established between the two in a pact. For Brigitte's portrayal, much of the "emotional burden [is placed] squarely on Emily Perkins' fragile shoulders". She undergoes several transitions: from "hero worship to independence as she tries to hang onto her sisterly bond" and "frightened goth mouse to something like the little werewolf hunter who could". In all, the entire premise of the movie showcases "a duet between Perkins's Brigitte and Katharine Isabelle's Ginger".

Appearances 
Brigitte Fitzgerald appears as the younger of the two Fitzgerald sisters (Brigitte and Ginger Fitzgerald) in all three films in the Ginger Snaps trilogy.

Ginger Snaps (2000)

Premise 
The film takes place in the town of Bailey Downs, Canada, in October 1999. During this time period, an unknown beast nicknamed the "Beast of Bailey Downs" has been killing the town's dogs.

Brigitte is the second daughter of Pamela and Henry Fitzgerald. She is a bright 15-year old girl, having a love of biology and having skipped a grade. The sisters grew up very close to one another, never leaving each other's sight. They were introverted nihilists, hating modern society and everything it represented, and also have a fascination with death. The girls' unusual views and the fact that both sisters have not yet started menstruating at their ages alienate them from their peers.  At the age of eight, the girls made an unbreakable blood pact to be "united against life", to create a new life by moving out at 16 or die together, swearing the oath to be "out by sixteen or dead in this scene, but together forever".[1] She finds solace and leadership in her older sister Ginger, who often ridicules her younger sister and takes the lead. Brigitte and her sister have an uneasy relationship with their parents, of whom they are very passive with and easily annoyed by. As a result, the Fitzgerald parents are effectively absent as parenting and guidance figures to the sisters.

Story 
The film begins on an atypical day in high school for Brigitte, finding out that Ginger, her sister, has started her period. That night on a full moon, Brigitte rescues Ginger from a beast attack. Observing Ginger's unnatural rate of healing from the attack and not knowing what attacked them, with no answers and no other choice, Brigitte breaks with her "introverted" persona to connect with local high-school drug dealer Sam (who ran over the beast chasing the sisters, saving them) for more information; he suggests the beast might be a lycanthrope.

Brigitte soon finds out about physical and mental transformations akin to puberty happening to Ginger, including sprouting hair from her wounds and heavy menstruation, and she is dismayed at Ginger's new flashy appearance and aggressive behavior, particularly in a sexual way. However, like her sister, who has begun hanging out with guys, Brigitte starts to "grow up" as well. In the meantime, Brigitte has gained confidence in herself and is seen antagonizing Ginger for the first time for embracing Ginger's changes, because it was their childhood pact to be "united against life". Brigitte finds herself becoming increasingly distanced from her sister, and she finds new company in Sam. After Brigitte discovers that Ginger killed a neighbor's dog, she uses a proposed silver ring piercing treatment by Sam, which turns out to have no effect.

On Halloween, Brigitte acquires monkshood from her mother and sees Sam for further help. Meanwhile, Ginger, angry that Brigitte "betrayed" her and believing that Brigitte has chosen Sam over her sister, refuses to help Brigitte in the future. Brigitte discovers that Ginger enjoys her violent impulses after Ginger's murder of two school faculty, and she berates Ginger. To Brigitte's dismay, Ginger makes up her decision and rescinds their childhood pact, and she states she no longer wants anything to do with Brigitte and leaves her behind.

Later at the Greenhouse Bash Halloween party, Brigitte finds Ginger hurting Sam, who refused Ginger's sexual advances. At her breaking point, Brigitte demands Ginger take her life instead to stop hurting everyone. Resolutely, Brigitte makes a palm wound on herself and Ginger and mixes the two girls' blood, signifying Brigitte's loyalty to her sister. Brigitte and Sam take Ginger, who is now rapidly undergoing the final transformation stages into a werewolf, to the Fitzgerald house to create more cure. Brigitte is seen feeling numb and later experiencing a fainting episode, signalling her beginning to transition as well.

At the Fitzgerald house, a fully transformed Ginger escapes, but Brigitte and Sam successfully create more cure in the kitchen closet amidst the turmoil. Sam proposes to Brigitte to take the cure herself and the two of them to run away together, but Brigitte, despite also showing affection for Sam, values her loyalty to her sister more and refuses his request. Sam goes to administer the cure, but is dragged away.  Brigitte goes after them, and finds a Ginger-wolf with a weakened Sam. Trying to prove her loyalty to Ginger, Brigitte starts to drink Sam's blood but can't continue, making Ginger, in a fit of rage, kill Sam.

Cornering Ginger in the sister's bedroom, Brigitte, at last realizing that Ginger never appreciated her and knowing that Ginger took away Sam from her, fully breaks away from the sister's childhood pact to be "out by sixteen or dead in this scene, but together forever" and defiantly states that she will not die in the room with her. Ginger, angered by Brigitte, lets her werewolf instincts take over and lunges toward Brigitte. Brigitte accidentally kills Ginger as the werewolf lunges into her knife. The film ends with Brigitte holding on to the dying Ginger and unused syringe and sobbing.

Ginger Snaps 2: Unleashed (2004) 
In Ginger Snaps 2: Unleashed, Brigitte returns as the main character, with her sister Ginger, as a minor character, appearing as a hallucination to her. After the events of the first film, Brigitte is on the run, focusing on seeking the antidote for her condition, but accidentally overdoses on monkshood antidote and is treated in a rehabilitation center. She tries to deny Ginger's warnings and her coercing of Brigitte to accept her transition. Compared to the first film Ginger Snaps, Brigitte is more determined and confident in herself and no longer relies on her sister for help. Despite her best efforts, she transitions into a werewolf with rapid progression. At the end of the film, she is a full werewolf, irreversible to changing back into a human. Ghost narrates that Brigitte is getting stronger and is waiting to be unleashed on her enemies.

Ginger Snaps Back: The Beginning (2004) 
This film is the prequel to Ginger Snaps and Ginger Snaps 2: Unleashed and features Brigitte and Ginger Fitzgerald together in person, set in early 1800's colonial Canada. Together with her sister, Brigitte is a lost orphan to Canadian explorers. Compared with the other two films in the series, Brigitte and Ginger act more or less as equals in their sister relationship, with Brigitte becoming more confident in herself but not antagonizing her sister as in Ginger Snaps 2: Unleashed. The sisters have a close bond and always stick together. Their past is unknown from the storyline. Brigitte is the ancestor of modern-day Brigitte Fitzgerald about 200 years later.

At the end of the film, both of them are outside the burning fort huddling in the snow. When Brigitte states that she is cold, Ginger quotes "I'm not". Brigitte cuts her hand and presses it against a cut on Ginger's hand, mixing their blood and infecting herself with the curse as well.

Reception

Cultural impact 
The challenges of young women as they reach adolescence are examined in Ginger Snaps and Ginger Snaps 2: Unleashed. Brigitte embodies the anxious young girl as she transitions into an adolescent- and with it the additional stresses of puberty. In Ginger Snaps, she feels uncomfortable being in her own skin and does not look forward to womanhood.

References

External links 
 Ginger Snaps official website (cached)
 Ginger Snaps official UK website
 Ginger-Snaps.com
 
 
 
 

Fictional werewolves
Film characters introduced in 2000
Female horror film characters
Ginger Snaps characters